The Union Territory of Daman and Diu had shared its administrator with Dadra and Nagar Haveli since its inception on 30 May 1987. The union territory of Daman and Diu was merged with the nearby territory of Dadra and Nagar Haveli to create the new union territory of Dadra and Nagar Haveli and Daman and Diu on 26 January 2020 and the office of Administrator of Daman and Diu was abolished on that date.

Administrator

See also
 Daman and Diu
 List of administrators of Dadra and Nagar Haveli and Daman and Diu
 List of administrators of Dadra and Nagar Haveli
 Governors in India

Sources
 http://www.worldstatesmen.org/India_states.html
 Ramjayam Nadar, Silvassa, Office Seceratary, UT PRESS CLUB

Daman and Diu
Indian government officials
 
DandD